The 2019 Munster Senior Hurling League, known for sponsorship reasons as the Co-Op Superstores Munster Hurling League, is the fourth Munster Senior Hurling League, an annual hurling league competition for county teams from the province of Munster.

For the first time, all six county teams competed, with Tipperary making their debut. They reached the final where they lost to Clare.

Competition format
The six teams are drawn into two groups of three teams. Each team plays the other teams in their group once, earning 2 points for a win and 1 for a draw. The two group winners advance to the final.

Group A

Table

Fixtures and results

Group B

Table

Fixtures and results

Final

League statistics

Top scorers

Top scorers overall

Top scorers in a single game

References

Munster Senior Hurling League
Munster Senior Hurling League